The 1984 Virginia Slims of Newport was a women's tennis tournament played on outdoor grass courts at the International Tennis Hall of Fame in Newport, Rhode Island in the United States that was part of the 1984 Virginia Slims World Championship Series. The tournament was held from July 30 through August 5, 1984. First-seeded Martina Navratilova won the singles title.

Finals

Singles
 Martina Navratilova defeated  Gigi Fernández 6–3, 7–6(7–3)
 It was Navratilova's 8th singles title of the year and the 94th of her career.

Doubles
 Anna-Maria Fernandez /  Peanut Louie-Harper defeated  Lea Antonoplis /  Beverly Mould 7–5, 7–6
 It was Fernandez's 1st career title. It was Louie-Harper's 1st title of the year and the 2nd of her career.

References

External links
 ITF tournament edition details

Virginia Slims of Newport
Virginia Slims of Newport
1984 in sports in Rhode Island